Gondwanothrix halsei is a species of small crustaceans (ca. ) within the order Anomopoda, placed in its own family, Gondwanotrichidae. It exists in a macrotrichid habitus found in humic coastal dune lakes and swamps in southwest Western Australia. The species' type locality is Angove Lake in the Two Peoples Bay Nature Reserve.

References

Cladocera
Monotypic arthropod genera
Branchiopoda genera